Kurt Nitschke (25 April 1908 – 6 December 1970) was a German racing cyclist. He rode in the 1931 Tour de France.

References

1908 births
1970 deaths
German male cyclists
Place of birth missing